Betoch ([bé to chə]) is an Ethiopian family sitcom starring Tilahun Gugsa airs on EBC (formerly ETV) since 2013. The series airs every Saturday and focuses on a middle class family living in Addis Ababa.

It gained wide popularity among the broader Ethiopian public as it was the first sitcom ever aired in the country.

Premise
Character Zeru (Tilahun Gugsa), is a patriarch who manages his whole family from financial problems and crisis, trying to make his family in the appropriate situation that is necessary to their life. His wife Azalu (Makda Haile) have knowledge about law, treating her children in a fair way. They live with their four children Meraf (Gelila Raesom), Bezabe (Fikadu Fasil), Erestae (Melat Tesfaye), and Yebekal (Ashenafi Mehalet). Although the series contains comedic in nature, it does touch on serious subjects from time to time, such as corruption.

Casts and characters

Death of Seble Tefera

Seble Tefera was known for playing the role of "Terfe" killed by car crash while she was travelling to Bahir Dar with her husband in the Ethiopian New Year. According to her husband, the car accident was caused by his distraction from increasing radio volume while driving and collapsed into stationed truck in area commonly called Saris. Seble was dead on arrival at a hospital hours later, and her burial took place at the Holy Trinity Cathedral with notable people and her relatives presented. Betoch suspended its broadcasting for months, the cast expressed its condolences, and commemorated her by rewinding previous episodes.

References

2013 television series debuts
2010s sitcoms
Ethiopian television series
Amharic-language television
Television series about families
Television series about children
Political comedy television series